Emanuel may refer to:
 Emanuel (name), a given name and surname (see there for a list of people with this name)
 Emanuel School, Australia, Sydney, Australia
 Emanuel School, Battersea, London, England
 Emanuel (band), a five-piece rock band from Louisville, Kentucky, United States
 Emanuel County, Georgia
 Emanuel (film), a 2019 documentary film about the Charleston church shooting

See also
 Emmanuel (disambiguation)
 Immanuel (disambiguation)
 Emanu-El (disambiguation), a list of Jewish synagogues by this name
 Immanuel (name), a given name in Hebrew, origin of the other forms in different languages
 Emmanouil (Εμμανουήλ), the modern Greek form of the name